Robert Emmitt Hardy (born July 3, 1956 in Tulsa, Oklahoma) is a former American football defensive tackle in the National Football League. He was drafted by the Seattle Seahawks in the 10th round of the 1979 NFL Draft. He played college football at Jackson State.

References 

1956 births
Living people
Sportspeople from Tulsa, Oklahoma
Players of American football from Oklahoma
American football defensive tackles
Jackson State Tigers football players
Seattle Seahawks players